Jimo City Stadium (Simplified Chinese: 即墨市体育场) is a 5,000-capacity multi-use stadium in Jimo, Qingdao, Shandong, China.  It is currently used mostly for association football matches.

It is located at 198 Lan'ao Road, Jimo. The stadium was reconstructed in 2000s.

External links
 Stadium image

Football venues in China
Sports venues in Shandong